Pseudancistrus genisetiger is a species of catfish in the family Loricariidae. It is native to South America, where it occurs in the Jaguaribe River basin in Brazil. The species reaches 10.3 cm (4.1 inches) SL.

References 

Loricariidae
Freshwater fish of Brazil
Fish described in 1941